"How Come" is a song co-written by Ronnie Lane and Kevin Westlake, and recorded by Lane as his first single in 1973 after he left Faces.  Featuring a band of constantly changing personnel called Slim Chance, including Benny Gallagher and Graham Lyle, who later had considerable success as a performing and songwriting duo in their own right, it reached No. 11 in the UK.

Gallagher played piano accordion and Lyle mandolin on the A-side, both also contributing back-up vocals.  "Done This One Before", on the B-side, featured Gallagher on Hammond organ and Lyle on harmonica.

The song was later recorded by Oscar Houchins, of the White Whale Recording group the Clique, and released by Monument Records in 1975.

In 1996 the song was used as the first track of the Pogues' seventh and last studio album Pogue Mahone.

1973 singles
Songs written by Ronnie Lane
Song recordings produced by Glyn Johns
1973 songs